Norwich Crown Point may refer to:

Crown Point, Norwich - an area within the city of Norwich, England
Crown Point TMD - a railway depot in Norwich, England